The 2015 Winter Deaflympics, officially known as the 18th Winter Deaflympics, is an international multi-sport event that took place in Khanty-Mansiysk and Magnitogorsk, Russian Federation from 28 March to 5 April 2015.

Venues

Logo
The games' logo is an abstract of a black grouse that symbolizes the wealth of khanti culture which resembles a hand of a man, the main device for communication of deaf and hard-of-hearing athletes and a bird. It consists of 4 colors which are red and orange that mean motion and energy and blue and violet that mean firmness and endurance. The ethnical ornament of khanti “hare’s ears” which is used in household items and clothes of khanti and mansi in the middle of the logo symbolizes motion. Overall, the logo represents host city, Khanty-Mansiysk as a confluence of two great rivers – Ob and Irtysh.

Mascot
The games' mascot is a baby mammoth, a symbol of Russian north that represents beauty and strength of Siberia and is described to have kind eyes crystal clear like rivers and lakes of Ugra and open as Russian soul. The name of the mascot was chosen as "Spartak" from an online voting process.

Participating nations

Schedule

Medal table

Results

Alpine skiing

Cross Country skiing

Curling

Men
Round-robin

Tiebreaker
 7 : 6 

Playoff

Women
Round-robin

Playoff

Medalists

Ice hockey

Snowboarding

References

 
2015
March 2015 sports events in Russia
April 2015 sports events in Russia
Sport in Khanty-Mansiysk
Sport in Magnitogorsk
2015 in Russian sport
2015 in multi-sport events
International sports competitions hosted by Russia
Parasports in Russia
Deaflympics,2015